Escalles is a commune in the Pas-de-Calais department in the Hauts-de-France region of France.

Geography

Population

Places of interest
 The Dover Patrol Monument is at the summit of Cap Blanc-Nez, dedicated to the British and French sailors of World War I.
 The church of St. Maxime, dating from the sixteenth century.
 The Musée Transmanche.

See also
Communes of the Pas-de-Calais department

References

External links

 http://www.escalles.fr/

Communes of Pas-de-Calais
Populated coastal places in France